Kawa Paltseg (alternate spelling Kawa Peltseg) was one of the twenty-five disciples of Guru Rinpoche (Padmasambhava) during the Tibetan Empire period. He was born in Kawa in Phenpo Valley. He was one of the seven monks ordained by the great abbot Śāntarakṣita (Shantarakshita) and became one of the greatest Tibetan translators in accordance with a prophecy by Guru Rinpoche. He was one of the most important contributors to the translation of the Tibetan Tripitaka and the Nyingma Gyübum. "Kawa" is a place name and "Paltseg" means "Mountain of resplendence."

See also
Nyingma lineage

References
 Kawa Paltseg at www.rigpawiki.org
 Kawa Peltseg at www.treasuryoflives.org
 Kawa Paltseg at rywiki.tsadra.org
 http://www.kamalashila.de/index.php?option=com_content&view=article&id=482&Itemid=270&lang=en

Year of birth missing
Year of death missing
Tibetan Buddhist monks